Afrosciadium friesiorum is a member of the carrot family, Apiaceae. It is a perennial tuberous herb, endemic to Mount Kenya.

Afrosciadium friesiorum was previously classified as Peucedanum friesiorum before the genus Afrosciadium was established in 2008. The variety A. f. var. bipinnatum was considered a separate species, P. aberdarense, until 1987.

Afrosciadium friesiorum has two accepted infraspecific varieties:
 Afrosciadium friesiorum var. bipinnatum
 Afrosciadium friesiorum var. friesiorum

Afrosciadium friesiorum is found only on the slopes of Mount Kenya. It grows to between 16 and 60 centimeters tall, with a stem 2 to 5 millimeters in diameter at its base. It boasts flowers with small, oblong, white petals, roughly 3 millimeters across. The root may form a tuber up to 8 centimeters long and 0.7 centimeters across.

References

Apioideae
Endemic flora of Kenya
Mount Kenya